Andrzej Sołoducha (born January 31, 1966 in Olsztyn) is a Polish sprint canoer who competed in the early 1990s. At the 1992 Summer Olympics in Barcelona, he was eliminated in the semifinals of the C-2 500 m event.

References
Sports-Reference.com profile

1966 births
Canoeists at the 1992 Summer Olympics
Living people
Olympic canoeists of Poland
Polish male canoeists
Sportspeople from Olsztyn
20th-century Polish people